Karla Tamburrelli (born 1956) is an American actress and television producer known for her work in the television series The Big Easy. In 1993, she was awarded the Joseph Jefferson Award for Best Lead Actress for "Lost in Yonkers"  at the Fox Theatre in Chicago, Illinois.

Screen Actors Guild 
In the late 1990s, Tamburrelli transitioned to being a TV producer. Her first major work behind the camera was for the first annual Screen Actors Guild award, which she produced between 1998 and 2006.

Filmography

Television series

Films

Theater

References

External links 
 

1956 births
American people of Italian descent
20th-century American actresses
American film actresses
American stage actresses
American television actresses
American television producers
American women television producers
Living people
Place of birth missing (living people)
21st-century American women